Chiraps excurvata is a species of moth of the family Tortricidae. It is found in Vietnam and Liaoning, China.

References

Archipini
Moths described in 1930
Moths of Asia
Taxa named by Edward Meyrick